Allsvenskan 1929–30, part of the 1929–30 Swedish football season, was the sixth Allsvenskan season played. The first match was played 4 August 1929 and the last match was played 1 June 1930. Hälsingborgs IF won the league ahead of runners-up IFK Göteborg, while IFK Norrköping and Stattena IF were relegated.

Participating clubs

League table

Promotions, relegations and qualifications

Results

Top scorers

References 

Print

Online

Notes 

Allsvenskan seasons
1
Sweden